Amaury Feitosa Tomaz Airport  is the airport serving Eirunepé, Brazil.

Airlines and destinations

Accidents and incidents
31 January 1978: a TABA – Transportes Aéreos da Bacia Amazônica Embraer EMB 110 Bandeirante registration PT-GKW crashed upon take-off from Eirunepé. The crew of 2 died but all 14 passengers survived.

Access

See also

List of airports in Brazil

References

External links

Airports in Amazonas (Brazilian state)